I Choose You may refer to:

 I Choose You (album), a 2004 release by Point of Grace
 "I Choose You" (Keyshia Cole song), a 2013 single by Keyshia Cole
 "I Choose You" (Sara Bareilles song), a 2014 single by Sara Bareilles
 "I Choose You", a 1973 song by Willie Hutch from The Mack soundtrack
 "International Players Anthem (I Choose You)", a 2007 single by UGK
 "I Choose You" (Grey's Anatomy), a 2015 episode of the medical drama series Grey's Anatomy

See also
"Pokémon, I Choose You!", the pilot episode of the Pokémon anime series
Pokémon the Movie: I Choose You!, 20th movie in the series
 "I Choose", song by The Offspring
 "Choose You", song by Stan Walker